Strike is a 2018 British stop-motion animated film directed by Trevor Hardy. It tells the story of Mungo, a young mole who wants to become a footballer. It is the first feature film made by Gigglefish Studios. The film premiered at the 2018 Carrefour du cinéma d'animation.

References

External links 
 
 

2018 films
2018 animated films
British animated films
Stop-motion animated films
2010s English-language films
2010s British films